Isla Damas, or Damas Island, is a small (6 km²) island in Costa Rica in the vicinity of Quepos.  It is particularly noted for its estuaries lined with mangroves.  Fauna on the island include white-faced monkeys, sloths, green iguanas, crocodiles, spectacled caimans, boas, crab-eating raccoons and silky anteaters, as well as crabs and numerous bird species, such as: heron, pelicans.  Boat and kayak tours through the island's estuaries are popular excursions with tourists staying in Quepos, Manuel Antonio National Park, or Jacó.

Gallery

Damas